CJK Unified Ideographs 07800-08CFF